Luis Leoncio Yordán Dávila (12 September 1869 – 29 December 1932) was an attorney and Mayor of Ponce, Puerto Rico, from 1917 to 1918.

Origin
Some sources state Yordan Davila was born in Guayanilla while others state he was born in Ponce. Either way he appears to have been born on 12 September 1869, the son of Ramon Yordan Gonzalez and Cruz Davila Torres.

Family life
Yordán Dávila married Angela Pasarell Pasarell. Their children were Luis Angel Yordan Pasarell, Rafael A. Yordan Pasarell, Oriol Yordan Pasarell, Belise Yordan Pasarell, and Jorge A. Yordan Pasarell.

Career
Yordán Dávila was a member of the House of Representatives of Puerto Rico. He was also president of the local chapter of the American Red Cross during World War I. He also presided the committee for the erection of the Luis Munoz Rivera statue on Plaza Las Delicias in Ponce.

In 1905 he was the fiscal commanding officer at the Ponce Firefighters Corps. In 1909 he co-founded the journal La Conciencia Libre (The Free Conscience) in Ponce. From 1910 to 1930 he was a lawyer and public notary. It was during this time that, in 1916, he became mayor of Ponce.

Mayoral work
Yordán Dávila is best known for being one of the main proposers of the bronze statue commemorating prominent poet, journalist, and politician Luis Muñoz Rivera that was eventually built and later (1923) unveiled in the Ponce town square that now bears the name Plaza Muñoz Rivera.

Death
Luis Yordan Davila died on 29 December 1932. Luis Fortuño Janeiro said of him, "Ponce lost one of the factors that most enriched its living." He was buried at Cementerio Civil de Ponce.

See also
 List of mayors of Ponce, Puerto Rico
 List of Puerto Ricans

References

Further reading
 Fay Fowlie de Flores. Ponce, Perla del Sur: Una Bibliografía Anotada. Second Edition. 1997. Ponce, Puerto Rico: Universidad de Puerto Rico en Ponce. p. 216. Item 1109. 
 Cayetano Coll y Toste. Boletín Histórico de Puerto Rico. San Juan, Puerto Rico: Cantera Fernandez. 1914–1927. (Colegio Universitario Tecnológico de Ponce, CUTPO).
 Fay Fowlie de Flores. Ponce, Perla del Sur: Una Bibliografía Anotada. Second Edition. 1997. Ponce, Puerto Rico: Universidad de Puerto Rico en Ponce. p. 336. Item 1675. 
 Ponce. Gobierno Municipal. Informe actividades administrativas y económicas del Municipio de Ponce. (Also titled Informe del Alcalde de la Ciudad de Ponce) Ponce, Puerto Rico: Imprenta El Día. 1917. (Archivo Histórico Municipal de Ponce)

1869 births
1932 deaths
American Red Cross personnel
Burials at Cementerio Civil de Ponce
People from Guayanilla, Puerto Rico
Puerto Rican Roman Catholics
Mayors of Ponce, Puerto Rico